Akarsu is a Turkish surname. Notable people with the surname include:

Barış Akarsu (1979–2007), Turkish rock musician
Hikmet Temel Akarsu (born 1960), Turkish novelist, short-story writer, satirist and playwright
Melisa Akarsu (Born 1993), Turkish female swimmer

See also
 Akarsu, Ardanuç, a village in Ardanuç district of Artvin Province, Turkey
 Akarsu, Altıeylül, a village
 Akarsu, Karayazı
 Akarsu, Refahiye
 Akarsu, Tarsus,  a village in Tarsus district of Mersin Province, Turkey

Turkish-language surnames